Le Vision Pictures (Levp), a subsidiary of LeEco, is a production and distribution company in China. Founded in 2011, Le Vision Pictures has headquarters in Beijing and offices in Hong Kong and Los Angeles, U.S.. It has produced and distributed several hits, including The Bullet Vanishes, The Expendables franchise and the Tiny Times franchise. More recently, Le Vision has signed Zhang Yimou, Lu Chuan, Tsui Hark and Guo Jingming. In 2014, the company was the sixth-largest film distributor in China, with 4.1% of the market.

History
In 2011, former president of Enlight Pictures, Zhang Zhao, founded Le Vision Pictures. He currently serves as Chairman & CEO of the new company. In May 2013,  Zhang Yimou, joined the firm as a contracted movie director and Creative Director. In March 2014, director Lu Chuan joined.

During its first two years, Le Vision  launched its “O2O Marketing System”, a business model to connect with consumers across new and established on-line/off-line platforms.

In August 2013, the firm raised RMB 200MM in its first round of financing, valuing it at RMB 1.5 billion.

In September 2014, Le Vision announced a second round of financing of RMB 340 million, at which time its value reached RMB 4.8 billion.

On 5 December 2015, LeEco announced that Le Vision Pictures would be sold to sister company le.com, subject to the approval of the shareholders of the listed company. As at 8 November 2016, the deal was not completed.

In January 2017 Sunac China acquired 15% stake from LeEco.

Films 
Le Vision produced and distributed six films in 2012. The Bullet Vanishes was nominated for four Golden Horse Awards (Taiwan), including “Best Picture”, and thirteen Hong Kong Film Awards. The Expendables 2, in which Le Vision co-invested and also co-distributed in China, grossed over $57 million in China, accounting for 18.5% of its total global box office revenue.

In 2013, Le Vision released nine films, grossing a total of $170 million. This included  Love Will Tear Us Apart,  Tiny Times & Tiny Times 2. Tiny Times took in $78.9 million at the box office that summer, setting a new record in China for a 2-D film opening.

During 2014, Le Vision released 13 films, grossing nearly $390 million in box office revenue 3. Boonie Bears: To the Rescue set a new box office record for a domestic animation film. Zhang Yimou's Coming Home was selected for the “Special Feature” section at the Cannes Film Festival and made nearly $48.4 million—breaking the existing record for arthouse films.

Multiple platforms
Le.com, the sister company of Le Vision, is the biggest Internet VOD platform in China. Anticipating the rise of home theater viewership in China, Le.com (known then as Letv Group) launched two leading products in VOD streaming, C1S and Super TV.

In April 2015, LeEco (known then as Letv Holding) launched its own smartphone.

Productions

 All's Well, End's Well 2012
 Fairy Tale Killer
 The Bullet Vanishes
 The Expendables 2
 Conspirators
 Tiny Times franchise
 Hello Babies
 Boonie Bears: To the Rescue! (3D Animation)
 Coming Home
 The Crossing Part I
 The Expendables 3
 Boonie Bears: Mystical Winter (3D Animation)
 You Are My Sunshine (He Yi Sheng Xiao Mo)
 Candle in the Tomb (Gui Chui Deng)
 The Crossing Part II
 Office (Hua Li Shang Ban Zu)
 Boonie Bears III
 Mr. High Heels
 Bounty Hunters 
 Time Raiders
 L.O.R.D: Legend of Ravaging Dynasties
 Suddenly Seventeen
 The Great Wall
 GG Bond: Guarding
 Boonie Bears: Entangled Worlds

References

Film distributors of China
Film production companies of China
Companies based in Beijing
Entertainment companies established in 2011
Chinese companies established in 2011
Chinese brands